SMAP 25 Years is a greatest hits album by Japanese boy band SMAP and the last one overall before their disbandment. It was released on 21 December 2016. It reached number-one on the weekly Oricon Albums Chart with 667,802 copies sold. It also reached number-one on the Billboard Japan Hot Albums chart.  It went on to sell over 1,174,000 copies and was the second best-selling album in Japan of 2017.

Track listing

Charts

Oricon

Billboard Japan

References

2016 greatest hits albums
Victor Entertainment compilation albums